Edward Osmund Bland (July 25, 1926–March 14, 2013) was an American composer and musical director.

Biography
Bland was born on the South Side of Chicago to Althea and Edward Bland. His father was a postal worker but also a self-taught literary critic with illustrious friends such as Ralph Ellison, Gwendolyn Brooks and Langston Hughes. Edward senior died in the Battle of the Bulge in 1944, and son Edward Bland also briefly  served in the Army during World War II, after which he studied at both the University of Chicago and the American Conservatory of Music on the G.I. Bill.

Among his compositions is a concerto for electric violin and chamber orchestra.  He composed scores for the TV play A Raisin in the Sun (1989) and the film A Soldier's Story (1984).  Another notable work is Sketches Set Seven for piano.

He also wrote, directed and produced the 1959 film The Cry of Jazz. In the 1990s, this documentary was rediscovered by scholars and celebrated as an early example of independent black filmmaking. It was soon restored and reissued on DVD in 1996, and in 2010 the Library of Congress added it to its National Film Registry collection as “a historic and fascinating film that comments on racism and the appropriation of jazz by those who fail to understand its artistic and cultural origins.”

Discography

As arranger
With Eric Kloss
Grits & Gravy (Prestige, 1966)

References

External links
 

Guide to the Ed Bland Collection, Center for Black Music Research, Columbia College Chicago

1926 births
2013 deaths
20th-century American composers
20th-century American male musicians
20th-century classical composers
21st-century American composers
21st-century American male musicians
21st-century classical composers
African-American classical composers
American classical composers
African-American male classical composers
American male classical composers
20th-century African-American musicians
21st-century African-American musicians